TimeLine Theatre Company is a not-for-profit theatre company located in the Lakeview East neighborhood of Chicago, Illinois.  Founded in 1997, TimeLine is a midsize theater with an annual budget exceeding $1 million.

History 
TimeLine Theatre Company was founded in April 1997 by six graduates of The Theatre School at DePaul University: Founding Artistic Director Nick Bowling, Brock Goldberg, Kevin Hagan, Juliet Hart, PJ Powers and Pat Tiedemann. On April 18, 1998, the company produced its first play, Summit Conference by Robert David MacDonald, at the Performance Loft Theatre at the 2nd Unitarian Church in Chicago. In September 1999, TimeLine moved into its current home in Baird Hall Theatre at the Wellington Avenue United Church of Christ on Wellington Ave., Chicago. The first production in this new home was Gaslight by Patrick Hamilton, which opened on October 21, 1999.

Starting with their 2011-2012 season, TimeLine began producing one play a season at a larger offsite location to accommodate audience growth.

In 1999, PJ Powers succeeded Bowling as Artistic Director. In 2007, Elizabeth K. Auman was named Managing Director. The company has since grown to include nine full-time staff members.

Awards 
TimeLine has received 52 Joseph Jefferson awards, including 11 awards for Outstanding Production in 15 seasons of eligibility.

In addition to awards for achievement in productions, TimeLine has also received the following recognition as an organization for its administrative management:
 2016 John D. and Catherine T. MacArthur Foundation Award for Creative and Effective Institutions 
 2011 American Theatre Wing's National Theatre Company Grant 
 One of the Top 10 Emerging Theatre Companies by the American Theatre Wing, founder of the Tony Awards.
 2011 "Best Theatre"
 Chicago Magazine "Best of Chicago"
 2010 "Company of the Year"
 Terry Teachout, The Wall Street Journal
 2009 Richard Goodman Strategic Planning Award, Non-Profit
 2006 Alford-Axelson Award for Nonprofit Managerial Excellence

See also 
 Theater in Chicago

References

External links 
 Official Website

Theatres in Chicago
Theatre companies in Chicago